Russian traders and soldiers began to appear on the northwestern edge of Kazakh territory in the 17th century, when Cossacks established the forts that later became the cities of Oral (Ural'sk) and Atyrau (Gur'yev). Russians were able to seize Kazakh territory because the khanates were preoccupied by Kalmyks (Oirats, Dzungars), who in the late 16th century had begun to move into Kazakh territory from the east. Forced westward in what they call their Great Retreat, the Kazakhs were increasingly caught between the Kalmyks and the Russians. Two of the Kazakh Hordes were dependant on Oirat Huntaiji. 
In 1730 Abul Khayr, one of the khans of the Lesser Horde, sought Russian assistance. Although Abul Khayr's intent had been to form a temporary alliance against the stronger Kalmyks, the Russians gained permanent control of the Lesser Horde as a result of his decision. The Russians conquered the Middle Horde by 1798, but the Great Horde managed to remain independent until the 1820s, when the expanding Kokand Khanate to the south forced the Great Horde khans to choose Russian protection, which seemed to be the lesser of two evils.

The conquest of Kazakhstan by Russia was slowed by numerous uprisings and wars in the 19th century. For example, uprisings of Isatay Taymanuly and Makhambet Utemisuly in 1836–1838 and the war led by Eset Kotibaruli in 1847–1858 were some of such events of anti-colonial resistance.

In 1863 Russian Empire elaborated a new imperial policy, announced in the Gorchakov Circular, asserting the right to annex "troublesome" areas on the empire's borders. This policy led immediately to the Russian conquest of the rest of Central Asia and the creation of two administrative districts, the General-Gubernatorstvo (Governor-Generalship) of Russian Turkestan and that of the Steppe. Most of present-day Kazakhstan was in the Steppe District, and parts of present-day southern Kazakhstan, including Almaty (Verny), were in the Governor-Generalship.

In the early 19th century, the construction of Russian forts began to have a destructive effect on the Kazakh traditional economy by limiting the once-vast territory over which the nomadic tribes could drive their herds and flocks. The final disruption of nomadism began in the 1890s, when many Russian settlers were introduced into the fertile lands of northern and eastern Kazakhstan. In 1906 the Trans-Aral Railway between Orenburg and Tashkent was completed, further facilitating Russian colonisation of the fertile lands of Semirechie. Between 1906 and 1912, more than a half-million Russian farms were started as part of the reforms of Russian minister of the interior Petr Stolypin, putting immense pressure on the traditional Kazakh way of life by occupying grazing land and using scarce water resources. The Russian settlements have distorted the fundamentally important routes of nomadic seasonal repositioning that Kazakhs have employed for many centuries. Russian appropriation of Kazakh-raised livestock was not uncommon, as was forced separation of young Kazakh women from the tribes to work as slaves or as entertainers.

Starving and displaced, many Kazakhs joined in the general Central Asian Revolt against conscription into the Russian imperial army, which the tsar ordered in July 1916 as part of the effort against Germany in World War I. In late 1916, Russian forces brutally suppressed the widespread-armed resistance to the taking of land and conscription of Central Asians. Thousands of Kazakhs were killed, and thousands of others fled to China and Mongolia. Some have succeeded, but many have failed and died in travel.

See also
 History of Kazakhstan

References